Holothuria is the type genus of the marine animal family Holothuriidae, part of the class Holothuroidea, commonly known as sea cucumbers. Members of the genus are found in coastal waters in tropical and temperate regions. They are soft bodied, limbless invertebrates that dwell on the ocean floor and are usually detritivore. They resemble a cucumber in form. The genus contains some species that are harvested and sold as food.

Species
The following species are recognised in the genus Holothuria:

 Subgenus Acanthotrapeza 
 Holothuria coluber 
 Holothuria kubaryi 
 Holothuria pyxis 
 Holothuria tripilata 
 Subgenus Cystipus 
 Holothuria casoae 
 Holothuria cubana 
 Holothuria dura 
 Holothuria hartmeyeri 
 Holothuria inhabilis 
 Holothuria jousseaumei 
 Holothuria mammosa 
 Holothuria occidentalis 
 Holothuria pseudofossor 
 Holothuria rigida 
 Holothuria sucosa 
 Holothuria turrisimperfecta 
 Subgenus Halodeima 
 Holothuria atra 
 Holothuria edulis 
 Holothuria enalia 
 Holothuria floridana 
 Holothuria grisea 
 Holothuria inornata 
 Holothuria kefersteinii 
 Holothuria manningi 
 Holothuria mexicana 
 Holothuria nigralutea 
 Holothuria pulla 
 Holothuria signata 
 Subgenus Holothuria 
 Holothuria caparti 
 Holothuria dakarensis 
 Holothuria fungosa 
 Holothuria helleri 
 Holothuria mammata 
 Holothuria massaspicula 
 Holothuria stellati 
 Holothuria tubulosa 
 Subgenus Lessonothuria 
 Holothuria cavans 
 Holothuria cumulus 
 Holothuria duoturricula 
 Holothuria glandifera 
 Holothuria immobilis 
 Holothuria insignis 
 Holothuria lineata 
 Holothuria multipilula 
 Holothuria pardalis 
 Holothuria tuberculata 
 Holothuria verrucosa 
 Subgenus Mertensiothuria 
 Holothuria albofusca 
 Holothuria aphanes 
 Holothuria arenacava 
 Holothuria artensis 
 Holothuria fuscorubra 
 Holothuria hilla 
 Holothuria isuga 
 Holothuria leucospilota 
 Holothuria viridiaurantia 
 Subgenus Metriatyla 
 Holothuria aculeata 
 Holothuria albiventer 
 Holothuria alex 
 Holothuria brauni 
 Holothuria conica 
 Holothuria cyrielle 
 Holothuria horrida 
 Holothuria keesingi 
 Holothuria lessoni 
 Holothuria martensii 
 Holothuria scabra 
 Holothuria submersa 
 Holothuria tortonesei 
 Subgenus Microthele 
 Holothuria fuscogilva 
 Holothuria fuscopunctata 
 Holothuria nobilis 
 Holothuria whitmaei 
 Subgenus Panningothuria 
 Holothuria austrinabassa 
 Holothuria forskali 
 Subgenus Platyperona 
 Holothuria crosnieri 
 Holothuria difficilis 
 Holothuria excellens 
 Holothuria insolita 
 Holothuria parvula )
 Holothuria rowei 
 Holothuria samoana 
 Holothuria sanctori 
 Subgenus Roweothuria 
 Holothuria arguinensis 
 Holothuria poli 
 Holothuria vemae 
 Subgenus Selenkothuria 
 Holothuria bacilla 
 Holothuria carere 
 Holothuria erinacea 
 Holothuria glaberrima 
 Holothuria lubrica 
 Holothuria mactanensis 
 Holothuria moebii 
 Holothuria parva 
 Holothuria parvispinea 
 Holothuria portovallartensis 
 Holothuria sinica 
 Holothuria theeli 
 Holothuria vittalonga 
 Subgenus Semperothuria 
 Holothuria cinerascens 
 Holothuria flavomaculata 
 Holothuria granosa 
 Holothuria imitans 
 Holothuria languens 
 Holothuria roseomaculata 
 Holothuria surinamensis 
 Subgenus Stauropora 
 Holothuria aemula 
 Holothuria annulifera 
 Holothuria bo 
 Holothuria discrepans 
 Holothuria dofleinii 
 Holothuria fuscocinerea 
 Holothuria hawaiiensis 
 Holothuria mitis 
 Holothuria modesta 
 Holothuria olivacea 
 Holothuria pervicax 
 Holothuria pluricuriosa 
 Subgenus Stichothuria 
 Holothuria coronopertusa 
 Subgenus Theelothuria 
 Holothuria asperita 
 Holothuria cadelli 
 Holothuria duoturriforma 
 Holothuria foresti 
 Holothuria hamata 
 Holothuria imperator 
 Holothuria klunzingeri 
 Holothuria kurti 
 Holothuria longicosta 
 Holothuria maculosa 
 Holothuria michaelseni 
 Holothuria notabilis 
 Holothuria paraprinceps 
 Holothuria princeps 
 Holothuria pseudonotabilis 
 Holothuria spinifera 
 Holothuria squamifera 
 Holothuria turriscelsa 
 Subgenus Thymiosycia 
 Holothuria altaturricula 
 Holothuria arenicola 
 Holothuria conusalba 
 Holothuria gracilis 
 Holothuria impatiens 
 Holothuria macroperona 
 Holothuria marginata 
 Holothuria milloti 
 Holothuria minax 
 Holothuria remollescens 
 Holothuria strigosa 
 Holothuria thomasi 
 Holothuria truncata 
 Holothuria unicolor 
 Holothuria zihuatanensis 
 Subgenus Vaneyothuria 
 Holothuria integra 
 Holothuria lentiginosa 
 Holothuria sinefibula 
 Holothuria suspecta 
 Holothuria unica 
 Holothuria zacae 
 Subgenus incertae sedis (uncertain placement)
 Holothuria platei 
 Holothuria pyxoides

References

Holothuriidae
Holothuroidea genera